Maria Spanò (September 25, 1843 - ) was an Italian woman painter.

Spanò was born in Naples, and initially trained under her father, Raffaele Spanò. She chose a variety of subjects, painting genre, landscapes, and history paintings. She also was well respected as a portraitist and painter of still lifes with flowers. At the 1859 Exposition in Naples, she displayed a half-figure painting of a Peasant woman of Sorrento, garnering a silver medal of merit. At an Expositions della Promotrice of Naples, she exhibited A Confidence, acquired by the Pinacoteca of Capodimonte. She completed two canvases bought by the Provincial Council of Naples, depicting life-sized Two Peasants and Un cortile di campagna. In another exposition she displayed La villa Mays. Among other works, she completed Bice al castello di Rosate.

References

1843 births
Italian women painters
Italian still life painters
19th-century Italian painters
Painters from Naples
Year of death missing
19th-century Italian women artists